Mr. Magoo is a French animated series made by Xilam with the participation of Classic Media. It premiered in Portugal on December 17, 2018. It had its official international premiere on Boomerang Africa HD on July 3, 2019. The series was Olivier Jean-Marie's final production before his death in 2021.

Plot
Mr. Magoo follows the eponymous kind-hearted fellow who is always happy to lend a hand—but often causes disasters instead, as without his glasses he makes all kinds of chaotic mix-ups. Despite this, his only enemy is Fizz, a megalomaniacal hamster who is somehow always accidentally thwarted by Magoo.

Cast

Main 
Mr. Magoo (voiced by Ian Hanlin) a happy-helping man without glasses. Due to his poor vision, he does not know what he is doing.
Mr. Cat (voiced by Colin Murdock), Mr. Magoo's pet Bull Terrier dog. While he is annoyed by his owner's poor vision, he cares deeply about him and rescues him in the most dangerous situations. He is also aware of what Fizz's intentions are and that Weasel works for Fizz.
Fizz (voiced by Colin Murdock), a villainous, evil talking orange hamster who wants to take over the world and to be worshipped forever but he is always defeated by Magoo. For some reason, he hates Magoo so much that he wants to kill him, but is always failing. Everytime he ends up screaming "MAGOO" after he has failed.
Weasel (voiced by Shawn MacDonald), Fizz's dimwitted yet loyal henchman and nicknamed Weaso. Magoo sometimes recognizes him, but is unaware of his real occupations.

Recurring 

 Linda, one of Magoo's neighbours.
 President, the president in Fizz City who slightly resembles Barack Obama.
 Marnie, the new girl that is in episode 11.

Episodes

Season 1 (2019-)

Broadcast

References

External links
 

2019 French television series debuts
2010s French animated television series
2020s French animated television series
French children's animated comedy television series
French flash animated television series
Xilam